An American Dream may refer to:

 An American Dream (novel), a 1965 novel by Norman Mailer
 An American Dream (film), a 1966 drama film based on the novel
 Norman Rockwell's World... An American Dream, a 1972 short documentary film
 An American Dream (album), a 1979 album by the Nitty Gritty Dirt Band
 "An American Dream" (song), the album's title track, also recorded by Rodney Crowell
 An American Dream (memoir), a posthumous memoir by Clarence Adams